Anabela Cossa (born 7 April 1986) is a Mozambican female professional basketball player.

External links
Profile at fiba.com
Profile at afrobasket.com

1986 births
Living people
Sportspeople from Maputo
Mozambican women's basketball players
Shooting guards
Basketball players at the 2018 Commonwealth Games
Commonwealth Games competitors for Mozambique